Neil McPherson (born London, 7 October 1969) is an artistic director and playwright.

Artistic directing
He was Artistic Director of the New End Theatre, Hampstead, from 1996 to 1997, and has been the Artistic Director of the Finborough Theatre, London, since January 1999.

Acting

He trained as an actor at the Central School of Speech and Drama and was a member of the National Youth Theatre for seven years. His acting roles included John Osborne in A Better Class of Person for Thames TV.

Playwriting
As a playwright, his plays include a documentary drama on the Armenian genocide, the award-winning I Wish To Die Singing – Voices From The Armenian Genocide which played at the Finborough Theatre in April 2015 while an excerpt was also produced in Los Angeles concurrently, and It Is Easy To Be Dead, based on the life of Charles Hamilton Sorley which played at the Finborough Theatre in May 2016, and transferred to Trafalgar Studios, London, in November 2016 where it was nominated for an Olivier Award. It also went on tour to Aberdeen and Glasgow in 2018.

I Wish To Die Singing – Voices From The Armenian Genocide and It Is Easy To Be Dead are both published by Oberon Books.

References

External links
Biography at the Finborough Theatre website

English theatre managers and producers
Scottish theatre managers and producers
British dramatists and playwrights
Anglo-Scots
Alumni of the Royal Central School of Speech and Drama
Alumni of the Sylvia Young Theatre School
National Youth Theatre members
1969 births
Living people